Durga - Its Not Just A Love Story is a 2002 Hindi film directed by J. D. Chakravarthy, with Priyanka Upendra and Sayaji Shinde in prominent roles. The film is a remake of the Telugu film, Soori.

Cast
 J. D. Chakravarthy as Durga 
 Priyanka Upendra as Gayatri 
 Sayaji Shinde
 Snehal Dabi

References

2002 films
2000s Hindi-language films
Hindi remakes of Telugu films